is a railway station in Shirataka, Yamagata, Japan, operated by the Yamagata Railway.

Lines
Koguwa Station is a station on the Flower Nagai Line, and is located 24.6 rail kilometers from the terminus of the line at Akayu Station.

Station layout
Koguwa Station has a single side platform serving traffic in both directions.

Adjacent stations

History
Koguwa Station opened on 11 December 1922. The station was absorbed into the JR East network upon the privatization of JNR on 1 April 1987, and became a station on the Yamagata Railway from 25 October 1988. A new station building was completed in April 2004.

Surrounding area
Mogami River

External links

  Flower Nagai Line 

Railway stations in Yamagata Prefecture
Yamagata Railway Flower Nagai Line
Railway stations in Japan opened in 1922